Scandolara Ripa d'Oglio is a comune (municipality) in the Province of Cremona in the Italian region Lombardy, located about  southeast of Milan and about  northeast of Cremona.

Scandolara Ripa d'Oglio borders the following municipalities: Alfianello, Corte de' Frati, Gabbioneta-Binanuova, Grontardo, Seniga.

References

Cities and towns in Lombardy